The Qingshui River or Creek is a tributary of the Lanyang River on Taiwan. It flows through Yilan County for 25 km.

Hot springs are found along the Qingshui River.

See also
 List of rivers in Taiwan
 Other Qingshuis in China and on Taiwan

References

Rivers of Taiwan
Landforms of Yilan County, Taiwan